Hot Country Songs is a chart that ranks the top-performing country music songs in the United States, published by Billboard magazine.  In 1982, 48 different singles topped the chart, then published under the title Hot Country Singles, in 52 issues of the magazine, based on playlists submitted by country music radio stations and sales reports submitted by stores.

The band Alabama achieved the most number ones by a single act, topping the chart four times.  Ronnie Milsap, T. G. Sheppard, Ricky Skaggs and Conway Twitty each had three number ones.  Alabama, Twitty and Willie Nelson tied for the most weeks in the top spot with four each.  Nelson's four weeks consisted of two weeks with "Always on My Mind" followed immediately by a further two with "Just to Satisfy You", a collaboration with Waylon Jennings.  In October, Dolly Parton topped the chart with the double A-sided single "I Will Always Love You" / "Do I Ever Cross Your Mind".  Both tracks were re-recordings of songs she had previously released in the 1970s, and the original recording of "I Will Always Love You" had reached number one in 1974, making Parton the first artist to top the chart with two different recordings of the same song.

Ed Bruce, best known for writing "Mammas Don't Let Your Babies Grow Up to Be Cowboys", a highly successful chart-topper for Waylon Jennings and Willie Nelson four years earlier, achieved his only number one as a performer in 1982 with "You're the Best Break This Old Heart Ever Had".  Several other artists reached the top spot for the first time in 1982, including Juice Newton  with "The Sweetest Thing (I've Ever Known)", Ricky Skaggs with "Crying My Heart Out Over You", Michael Murphey (later known as Michael Martin Murphy) with "What's Forever For", and John Anderson with "Wild and Blue".  In August George Strait topped the chart for the first time with "Fool Hearted Memory"; Strait would go on to top the chart regularly for more than 25 years, achieving a record-breaking 44 Hot Country number ones.

Chart history

a.  Double A-sided single

See also
1982 in music
List of artists who reached number one on the U.S. country chart

References

1982
1982 record charts
Country